The North East Children’s Trust (NECT) is a private sector led social engineering initiative incorporated in 2017 with a mission to create innovative, transformational sustainable learning ecosystems that will nurture, renew and empower vulnerable children  between ages 5 and 18 years that have been orphaned by the insurgency in North East Nigeria.

Since 2012, the Boko Haram insurgency has enveloped north east Nigeria to varying degrees. At the height of the crises, about 80% of 1.8 million internally displaced persons were from Borno state, followed by Adamawa and Yobe states with 8% and 6% respectively. Children aged 18 years and below comprised over 50% of the IDP population.        

About 50,000 children are estimated to be orphaned by the insurgency without access to good education, quality health care, food and basic shelter. Without assistance, these children will not have a normal childhood nor experience the joys of growing in a home nurtured by a family.

Therefore, NECT aims to create ecosystems carefully designed to provide comprehensive support for the children through access to safe living spaces, quality education, good health facilities, well-rounded psychosocial support and relevant socio-economic life skills.

Mission 
NECT seeks to establish learning centers within local communities  to deliver context specific and student-centred learning through purposeful partnerships that leverage the capabilities, contributions and networks of diverse stakeholders.

Vision 
Our vision over the next 5 years is to scale for impact. This will entail transiting from a centralised and institutionalised service delivery model into a more sustainable community oriented service delivery model.

Objectives 

 To develop innovative and scalable solutions to ensure that vulnerable children build strong foundations for lifelong learning and well-being
 To build learning systems that are adaptable, skill-based, and fit for the skills and competencies needed in the 21st century
 To reimagine affordable alternative pathways to education for students who are unable to access conventional schooling opportunities
 To forge new alliances amongst private and public sector partners in order to establish novel education financial infrastructure

Board Of Trustees 
The board of trustees is a five-member group of prestigious humanitarians in Nigeria. Jim Ovia, who is the chairman of the board, is the founder of Zenith bank and a reputable philanthropist whose foundation has empowered over four thousand Nigerian youths in scholarships and entrepreneurial funding. Hauwa Biu, who is the vice chairman of the board, is a girl-child/ woman education activist, and chairperson of newly established Borno Education Trust Fund. Mariam Masha, who is the executive secretary of the board, is the senior special assistant to the 2020 incumbent president of the Federal Republic of Nigeria on Humanitarian Interventions. Doris Yaro is a gender-equality activist and founder of Gabasawa Women & Children Empowerment Initiative, an NGO which provides scholarships and support to public primary school children affected by the Insurgency. Finally, Baba Hassan Kachalla is the founder of Society for Prevention and Eradication of Tuberculosis in Nigeria.

Projects

Learning Center I 
The flagship Learner Center was completed in 2017, just six months after construction commenced and saw the enrollment of the first batch of orphaned children into its abode. It was established to comfortably accommodate a thousand orphans.

Learning Center II 
As a strategy to reach the Trusts' goal of providing full support to 10,000 children orphaned by the Boko Haram insurgency, NECT adopted Maiduguri International School (MISET), a community owned school established in 1981 and located in Borno state's metropolis, which in the heat of insurgency had lost all semblance of its past glory and lay decrepit until NECT's intervention of total upgrade and remodeling in 2019. The commissioning of the school held on the 8th of October 2019, two years after the establishment of Learning Center I and the highlight of the event was the provisional support of eight million naira for offsetting the outstanding salaries owed to the entire staff, and setting up of scholarships for all the orphans from host communities enrolled in the school, all in addition to the 200+ million project cost of the intervention. Before NECT's intervention, MISET had suffered a dearth of infrastructure, low enrollment rates and a backlog of unpaid staff salaries.

References 

Non-profit corporations
Education in Borno State